The men's road time trial cycling events at the 2020 Summer Paralympics will take place on August 31 at Fuji Speedway, Oyama, Japan. Twelve events will take place over twelve classifications. The T1-2 time trial, which takes in two classifications, was a 'factored' event, with times adjusted by classification to allow fair competition. All events (finals) are to be held on the same day (August 31).

Classification
Cyclists are given a classification depending on the type and extent of their disability. The classification system allows cyclists to compete against others with a similar level of function. The class number indicates the severity of impairment with "1" being most impaired.

Cycling classes are:
B: Blind and visually impaired cyclists use a Tandem bicycle with a sighted pilot on the front
H 1–5: Cyclists with an impairment that affects their legs use a handcycle
T 1–2: Cyclists with an impairment that affects their balance use a tricycle
C 1–5: Cyclists with an impairment that affects their legs, arms, and/or trunk but are capable of using a standard bicycle

Medal table

Medal summary

References

Men's road time trial